The Arhuaco are an indigenous people of Colombia.

Arhuaco may also refer to:

Arhuaco language
Arhuaco (genus), a butterfly genus in the family Nymphalidae